The Cuyuteco people, also known as Cuyuteca, was a tribe of the Nahua culture, that lived primarily in the Pre-Columbian Mixtlan region of Xalisco, in the present day state of Jalisco in western central Mexico.  The Nahua are one of the main cultural groups of Mesoamerica.

History
The Cuyuteco people, also known as Cuyuteca, was a tribe of the Nahua culture. The Nahua are one of the main culture groups in Mesoamerica. The Cuyuteca were a Late Postclassic period group, with estimated 12th century arrival in the Xalisco region. From the migration period, and the Cuyuteco language a Uto-Aztecan Nahuatl language, they appear descended from ancient Nahua peoples that originated in Aridoamerica, in the deserts of present-day northwestern Mexico and the southwestern United States.

From the 10th to the 16th centuries, many nomadic tribes hunted game in Jalisco’s central valley. The Cuyuteco Indians lived near the present-day towns of Cuyutlán and Mixtlán, and the Coca occupied the vicinity of Guadalajara. The region extending from Guadalajara northeast to Lagos de Moreno was home to the Tecuexes.
It is believed that the Cuyuteco tribe became extinct due to cultural suppression from the Spanish.

Present day
Archaeological sites are in and around the present day towns of Tecolotlán, Tenamaxtlán, Juchitlán, Atengo, and Atenguillo in Jalisco; and Valle de Banderas in Nayarit.

See also
Aztlán — legendary ancestral home
Indigenous peoples of Mexico
Mesoamerican chronology
Uto-Aztecan languages

References

Peter Gerhard, The North Frontier of New Spain. Princeton, New Jersey: Princeton University Press, 1982. 
Eric Van Young, "The Indigenous Peoples of Western Mexico from the Spanish Invasion to the Present: The Center-West as Cultural Region and Natural Environment," in Richard E. W. Adams and Murdo J. MacLeod, The Cambridge History of the Native Peoples of the Americas, Volume II: Mesoamerica, Part 2. Cambridge, U.K.: Cambridge University Press, 2000, pp. 136–186.

Indigenous peoples in Mexico
Nahua people
Post-Classic period in the Americas
History of Jalisco
People from Nayarit
Ethnic groups in Mexico